Harry L. Franklin (September 5, 1880 – July 3, 1927) was a director of silent films in the United States.

Life
Franklin was born in St. Louis, Missouri, and began his film directing career as an assistant to Edwin Carewe. He worked for Metro Pictures and directed several Hale Hamilton films. He was accused of smuggling alcohol in film canisters in violation of the Volstead Act.

Franklin married Mildred Dean. He was found dead in Hollywood, California, in July 1927, aged 46.

Films
The Secret Gift (1920)
Rouge and Riches (1920)
Her Five-Foot Highness (1920)
After His Own Heart (1919)
The Four-Flusher (1919)
That's Good (1919)
Johnny-on-the-Spot (1919)
Full of Pep (1919)
The Winning of Beatrice (1918)
Kildare of Storm (1918)
Sylvia on a Spree 1917

References

1880 births
1927 deaths
Silent film directors
Film directors from Missouri